2017 World Cup may refer to:

 2017 Alpine Skiing World Cup
 2017 Canoe Slalom World Cup
 2016–17 Fencing World Cup
 2017 FIFA Beach Soccer World Cup
 2017 FIFA Club World Cup
 2017 FIFA U-17 World Cup
 2017 FIFA U-20 World Cup
 2017 Rugby League World Cup
 2017 Women's Cricket World Cup
 2017 Women's Lacrosse World Cup
 2017 Women's Rugby League World Cup
 2017 Women's Rugby World Cup
 2017 World Cup (snooker)
 Chess World Cup 2017

See also
 2017 World Championship (disambiguation)